John Warren "Jack" Bergman (born February 2, 1947) is a retired United States Marine Corps lieutenant general and politician serving as the U.S. representative from Michigan's 1st congressional district since 2017. He is a member of the Republican Party. He served as commanding general of the Marine Forces Reserve and the Marine Forces North. He also served as a naval aviator, flying rotary-winged aircraft such as the CH-46 and UH-1, as well as fixed-wing aircraft such as the T-28 and KC-130.

Early life and education 

Bergman was born on February 2, 1947, in Shakopee, Minnesota, and received his undergraduate degree in business from Gustavus Adolphus College in 1969. He subsequently earned an M.B.A. degree from the University of West Florida. His formal military education includes Naval Aviation Flight Training, Amphibious Warfare School, Marine Corps Command & Staff College, Landing Force Staff Planning (Marine Expeditionary Brigade [MEB] and Air Command Element [ACE]), Reserve Component National Security and Naval War College Strategy & Policy, Syracuse University National Security Seminar, Combined Forces Air Component Command, LOGTECH, and CAPSTONE.

Military career 

After graduating from college, Bergman was a commissioned second lieutenant in the Marine Corps Reserve in 1969 under the Platoon Leader School program. He flew CH-46 helicopters with HMM-261 at Marine Corps Air Station, New River, North Carolina, and with HMM-164 in Okinawa, Japan, and the Republic of Vietnam. Assigned as a flight instructor, he flew the T-28 with VT-6, NAS Whiting Field, Florida. He left active duty in 1975 and flew UH-1 helicopters with the Rhode Island National Guard, Quonset Point, Rhode Island.

After a 1978 civilian employment transfer to Chicago, Bergman transferred from the Rhode Island National Guard back to the Marine Corps Reserve, where he served in several 4th Marine Aircraft Wing units at NAS Glenview, Illinois: HML-776, flying the UH-1; VMGR-234, flying the KC-130; and Mobilization Training Unit IL-1. He was selected to stand up the second KC-130 squadron in 4th MAW and in 1988 became the first commanding officer of VMGR-452, Stewart Air National Guard Base (ANGB), Newburgh, New York. From 1992 to 1994 he commanded Mobilization Station, Chicago.

In 1995, he was a special staff officer at Marine Corps Reserve Support Command, Overland Park, Kansas. In 1996, he became chief of staff/deputy commander of I Marine Expeditionary Force Augmentation Command Element, Camp Pendleton, California. In 1997, he transferred to the 4th Marine Aircraft Wing Headquarters, New Orleans, to serve as assistant chief of staff/G-1. Promoted to brigadier general, he became deputy commander of the 4th Marine Aircraft Wing.

Transferred in June 1998 to Headquarters, Marine Forces Europe, Stuttgart, Germany, Bergman served as deputy commander. Recalled to active duty from April to July 1999, he was dual-hatted as EUCOM, Deputy J-3A. He then commanded II Marine Expeditionary Force Augmentation Command Element, Camp Lejeune, North Carolina, until assuming command of the 4th Marine Aircraft Wing, New Orleans, Louisiana in August 2000.

In September 2002, Bergman assumed command of the 4th Force Service Support Group, New Orleans, Louisiana. He also served as chairman of the Secretary of the Navy's Marine Corps Reserve Policy Board from 2001 to 2003. Returning to active duty in October 2003, he served as director of Reserve Affairs, Quantico, Virginia. He began his final assignment, command of the Marine Forces Reserve/Marine Forces North, on June 10, 2005. He relinquished that command in October 2009 and retired from active duty in December of that year.

U.S. House of Representatives

Elections

2016 

Bergman won the Republican primary in Michigan's 1st congressional district in August 2016. He defeated Democratic nominee Lon Johnson and Libertarian nominee Diane Bostow in the November general election. Bergman, who was elected to succeed retiring Republican Representative Dan Benishek, won 55% of the vote to Johnson's 40% and Bostow's 4%.

The district covers all of Michigan's Upper Peninsula and the northern part of the Lower Peninsula.

Tenure 
Bergman assumed office on January 3, 2017. He is a member of the Republican Study Committee, the Climate Solutions Caucus and the U.S.-Japan Caucus.

In June 2017, Bergman was one of the Republican congressmen who were practicing on an Alexandria, Virginia, baseball field for the annual Congressional Baseball Game when James Hodgkinson began shooting at them, harming four people, including Representative Steve Scalise. Afterward, Bergman blamed the incident on anti-GOP rhetoric and the media.

As of January 2022, Bergman has voted with President Biden's stated position roughly 6% of the time.

Committee assignments 
 Committee on Armed Services
 Chairman, Subcommittee on Intelligence and Special Operations
 Subcommittee on Seapower and Projection Forces
 Committee on Veterans' Affairs
 Subcommittee on Health 
 Subcommittee on Oversight and Investigations
 United States House Budget Committee

Caucus memberships 

 Republican Study Committee
 Climate Solutions Caucus
 U.S.-Japan Caucus.

Political positions

Spending and budget 
In March 2016, Bergman said that cutting spending would be his top priority in Congress.

In a July 2016 television interview, Bergman said his three top priorities were to "get Congress working together" instead of being preoccupied with partisan division, to "utilize the Constitution", and to pass a balanced budget amendment.

In March 2021, all House Republicans including Bergman voted against the American Rescue Plan Act of 2021, an economic stimulus bill aimed at speeding up the United States' recovery from the economic and health effects of the COVID-19 pandemic and the ongoing recession.

Healthcare
Bergman opposes the Affordable Care Act and voted to repeal it in May 2017.

Environment
In September 2017, Bergman became the 29th Republican to join the Climate Solutions Caucus.

Bergman voted in favor of the Tribal Coastal Resiliency Act, which would allow the Department of Commerce to award grants to Native American tribes for historical preservation, environmental protection, and climate change mitigation in the Great Lakes.

Marriage
Bergman voted against the "Respect for Marriage Act" codifying Loving v. Virginia and Obergefell v. Hodges, recognizing marriages across state lines regardless of "sex, race, ethnicity, or national origin of those individuals."

Military
Bergman sided with President Trump on barring transgender individuals from the military.

2020 presidential election
After Joe Biden won the 2020 presidential election and Trump refused to concede, Bergman announced he would oppose the confirmation of the Electoral College's vote in Congress.

In December 2020, Bergman was one of 126 Republican members of the House of Representatives to sign an amicus brief in support of Texas v. Pennsylvania, a lawsuit filed at the United States Supreme Court contesting the results of the 2020 presidential election, in which Biden defeated Trump.

In January 2021, Bergman announced his intention to object to the certification of the Electoral College results.

Awards and decorations 
Bergman's military awards include:

Medals and ribbons

Personal life
Bergman lives in Watersmeet, Michigan, with his wife Cindy. They have ten grandchildren. Bergman is a Lutheran.

References

External links 
 Congressman Jack Bergman official U.S. House website
 Campaign website
 
 
 

|-

1947 births
21st-century American politicians
American Lutherans
United States Marine Corps personnel of the Vietnam War
Gustavus Adolphus College alumni
Living people
Lutherans from Michigan
Military personnel from Minnesota
People from Gogebic County, Michigan
People from Shakopee, Minnesota
Republican Party members of the United States House of Representatives from Michigan
Recipients of the Air Medal
Rhode Island National Guard personnel
United States Army Command and General Staff College alumni
United States Marine Corps generals
United States Marine Corps reservists
United States Naval Aviators
University of West Florida alumni